Amma is an unincorporated community in Roane County, West Virginia, United States.  Its elevation is 722 feet (220 m).

Amma was named after the daughter of a settler.

References

Unincorporated communities in Roane County, West Virginia
Unincorporated communities in West Virginia